See also the Africa section of: Nafir
The kakaki is a three to four metre long metal trumpet used in Hausa traditional ceremonial music. Kakaki is the name used in Chad, Burkina Faso, Ghana, Benin Niger, and Nigeria. 

The instrument is also known as malakat in Ethiopia.

An ancient instrument, the kakaki was predominant among Songhai cavalry. Its sound is associated with royalty and it is only played at events at the palace of the king or sultan in Hausa societies. It is used as part of the sara, a weekly statement of power and authority. Kakaki are exclusively played by men.

See also
 Hausa music
 fanfare
 Wazza

References 
 Chad - Arts and Literature
 BBC article at Internet Archive
 The Orchestra in the African Context

Brass instruments
West African musical instruments
Hausa music
Nigerien musical instruments
Nigerian musical instruments
Chadian musical instruments
Burkinabé musical instruments
Ethiopian musical instruments
Hausa musical instruments